The following is a list of massacres that have occurred in France (numbers may be approximate):

Celtic Gaul

Roman Gaul

Merovingian Francia

Carolingian Francia

Capetian France

Valois France

Bourbon France

Revolutionary and Imperial France

Bourbon Restoration

July Monarchy

Second Republic

Second Empire

Third Republic

Second World War

Post-War

See also
 List of terrorist attacks in France

Citations

References

 
 
 
 
 

France
Massacres

Massacres